A referendum on a National Charter was held in Algeria on 27 June 1976. The charter committed the country to socialism adapted to third-world conditions, and was approved by 98.4% of voters with a turnout of 91.8%.

Results

References

External links 
 

Referendums in Algeria
1976 in Algeria
1976 referendums